Manon Bollegraf and Martina Navratilova were the defending champions but only Bollegraf competed that year with Nicole Arendt.

Arendt and Bollegraf won in the final 6–4, 6–2 against Wiltrud Probst and Rene Simpson.

Seeds
Champion seeds are indicated in bold text while text in italics indicates the round in which those seeds were eliminated.

 Nicole Arendt /  Manon Bollegraf (champions)
 Katrina Adams /  Zina Garrison-Jackson (quarterfinals)
 Sandra Cecchini /  Patricia Tarabini (quarterfinals)
 Wiltrud Probst /  Rene Simpson (final)

Draw

External links
 1995 Gallery Furniture Championships Doubles Draw

Virginia Slims of Houston
1995 WTA Tour